{{DISPLAYTITLE:C19H25NO4}}
The molecular formula C19H25NO4 (molar mass: 331.41 g/mol, exact mass: 331.1784 u) may refer to:

 Annimycin
 NBOMe-mescaline, or mescaline-NBOMe
 Tetramethrin